Kwon Jip (Hangul: 권집; born 13 February 1984) is a South Korean former footballer. He was involved in a match-fixing scandal and his football career was rescinded.

Honors

Club
Suwon Bluwings
K-League (1): 2004

Jeonbuk Hyundai Motors
Korean FA Cup (1): 2005
AFC Champions League (1): 2006

Individual
2002 Germany Everdingen Tournament Best Player 3rd
2002 AFC Youth Championship Best XI

Club career statistics

References

External links
 
 

1984 births
Living people
Association football midfielders
South Korean footballers
Suwon Samsung Bluewings players
Jeonnam Dragons players
Jeonbuk Hyundai Motors players
Pohang Steelers players
Daejeon Hana Citizen FC players
Tianjin Jinmen Tiger F.C. players
K League 1 players
Chinese Super League players
Expatriate footballers in China
South Korean expatriate sportspeople in China